Club Leones Negros de la Universidad de Guadalajara Premier play in the Liga Premier in Zapopan, Mexico and are the official reserve team for Leones Negros UdeG.

Players

Current squad

References

External links

Football clubs in Jalisco
Liga Premier de México
Association football clubs established in 2013
2013 establishments in Mexico